Eublepharis satpuraensis, sometimes called the Satpura leopard gecko is a gecko endemic to central Indian states of Madhya Pradesh, Maharashtra and Chhattisgarh.

Etymology
The new species is named after the Satpura Hills in central India, where the type locality is located.

References

Eublepharis
Reptiles of India
Reptiles described in 2014